Crinellus is a genus of moths in the family Lecithoceridae. It contains the species Crinellus eremicus, which is found in Papua New Guinea.

References

Lecithocerinae
Monotypic moth genera